David Orton may refer to:

David E. Orton, American businessman
David Orton (deep ecology) (1934–2011), Canadian writer and environmental activist